The 1966 All England Championships was a badminton tournament held at Wembley Arena, London, England, from 23–26 March 1966.

Final results

Heather Ward married and played under the name Heather Nielsen.

Men's singles

Section 1

Section 2

Women's singles

Section 1

Section 2

References

All England Open Badminton Championships
All England
All England Open Badminton Championships in London
All England Badminton Championships
All England Badminton Championships
All England Badminton Championships